Kimberly Nicole Klacik (née Bray; born January 19, 1982) is an American businesswoman and former political candidate. In both elections, she lost to Democrat Kweisi Mfume by more than 40 points.

Biography
Klacik was born Kimberly Bray on January 19, 1982. Klacik grew up in Accokeek, Maryland. She attended Bowie State University, but did not receive a degree. She moved to the Baltimore area in 2010.

Klacik worked for some time as a stripper. In 2013, she founded Potential Me, a nonprofit that assists women with workforce development. Courthouse News reported that Klacik's non-profit filed only one tax return since 2013, reporting a revenue of under $7,000 and expenditures under $3,000 for providing clothing to 10 women rather than the 200 women claimed by Klacik.

In April 2022, Klacik became a full-time midday host at Baltimore's WBAL NewsRadio, Monday-Friday from 10 a.m. to 2 p.m. Klacik had worked part-time for WBAL since June 2021, making regular weekly appearances on afternoon host Torrey Snow’s show. She left the station in November 2022.

Political career
Klacik was elected to the Baltimore County Republican Central Committee in 2018. Fox News in 2019 called her a "Republican strategist" and noted her critiques of Congressman Elijah Cummings and the living standards and safety issues in his district.

In a July 2019 interview on Fox & Friends, Klacik talked about Cummings's Baltimore district being overrun by trash and dilapidation. An hour later, President Donald Trump echoed the segment by beginning to disparage both the city of Baltimore and Cummings on Twitter in a series of 19 tweets over two days. Klacik responded to Trump's Twitter comments by tweeting, "This just made my day."

April 2020 special election

Klacik ran in the special election for Maryland's 7th Congressional District to replace Cummings, who had died in October 2019. After winning the Republican primary, she faced Kweisi Mfume, a former Democratic holder of the seat. In the general election Klacik received 25.1 percent of the votes, losing to Mfume, who received 73.8 percent.

November 2020 election

Maryland's 7th District, which included parts of Baltimore County, the majority of Howard County, and more than half of Baltimore City, has been represented by Democrats for decades. No Republican has ever held the seat. Klacik, who did not live in the district, promised to move there if elected. She won the Republican primary on June 2, 2020.

On August 18, 2020, Klacik's campaign released a viral video, titled "Black Lives Don't Matter To Democrats", which was filmed in a dilapidated area of Baltimore. The video shows her asking three residents whether they wanted to defund the police, and they said that they did not. Klacik also criticized the Democratic leaders of Maryland's 7th congressional district, citing Baltimore's alleged notoriety as being among the most dangerous cities in America. The video, posted on Twitter, garnered 4.4 million views its first day, reaching 10 million views by August 22, 2020. Fact-checking website Snopes called the video "misleading". It presented an area of Baltimore, one with a higher poverty rate and more homicides than the 7th District overall, as representative of the district. The video was conceived of and directed and produced by Benny Johnson, chief creative officer of Turning Point USA. According to Snopes, Klacik's campaign had "framed the video as one, long walk through a Baltimore neighborhood" but it was actually filmed from different angles along both sides of a section of Whitelock Street that can be walked in two minutes, and Klacik was shown on a roof of a building at two different points in the video.

President Donald Trump retweeted her ad, stating that "Kimberly will work with the Trump Administration and we will bring Baltimore back, and fast. Don't blow it Baltimore, the Democrats have destroyed your city!" Klacik was one of the speakers on the first day of the 2020 Republican National Convention, where she gave a two-minute speech.

After Klacik accused Mfume in a Twitter post of avoiding debating her, Mfume responded with a post saying that Klacik lacked familiarity with Baltimore, does not live in the city, and that a widely-viewed campaign advertisement of Klacik's had misspelled the city's name.

Klacik lost the election with 28 percent of the vote to Mfume's 71.6 percent. She conceded the race to Mfume. On November 8, Klacik claimed that she had won in-person voting and that she had raised enough donations to investigate alleged "irregularities." According to the results published by the State Board of Elections, Mfume received more votes in in-person early and election-day voting as well as in mail-in and provisional voting.

By the end of her 2020 House election campaign, Klacik had raised $8.3 million from small donors, most of them not from Maryland. A 2021 Washington Post article on Klacik's campaign finance filings showed that the campaign paid $4.2 million to two consulting firms. One of them, Arsenal Media Group, who had contracted with Benny Johnson to script and direct the August 2020 campaign video, received over $500,000. The other one, Olympic Media, was paid almost $3.7 million. Klacik's campaign initially reported part of it to the Federal Election Commission as payments to Republican fundraising platform WinRed.

Personal life
Klacik is married to Jeff Klacik. They have a daughter and live in Middle River, Maryland.

Defamation lawsuit against Candace Owens
Commentator Candace Owens accused Klacik of being a strip club “madame” who spent campaign funds on cocaine. Klacik responded by filing a $20M defamation lawsuit in August 2021. The suit was dismissed with prejudice in December 2022.

Electoral history

April 2020 special congressional election 

Republican primary

General election

November 2020 congressional election 

Republican primary

General election

See also
 Black conservatism in the United States

References

External links

1982 births
21st-century American politicians
21st-century American women politicians
21st-century African-American women
21st-century African-American politicians
African-American people in Maryland politics
African-American women in politics
Black conservatism in the United States
Bowie State University alumni
Candidates in the 2020 United States elections
Living people
Maryland Republicans
People from Baltimore County, Maryland
Women in Maryland politics
20th-century African-American people
20th-century African-American women